The bypass around Des Moines, Iowa, is a  freeway around the south and east of the Des Moines metropolitan area.  The route is made up of two state highways – Iowa Highway 5 (Iowa 5) and U.S. Highway 65 (US 65).  The bypass begins in southwestern West Des Moines at Iowa 5's interchange with Interstate 35 (I-35).  It heads to the east and then curves to the north near the southeastern side of Des Moines.  It ends at the interchange of US 65 and I-80 in Altoona.

The bypass was planned concurrently in the 1970s and 1980s as two segments, Iowa 500, which is represented today by the US 65 segment north of the Iowa 5 interchange near Carlisle, and the much longer Iowa 592, which is represented by Iowa 5 from I-35 in West Des Moines to Iowa 92 near Pleasantville.
Area leaders would like to see the road designated as an Interstate Highway, but significant obstacles have prevented that from happening. The bypass, together with Interstate 80 and 35, forms a beltway around Des Moines.

Route description

The bypass begins at directional T interchange with I-35 on the southwestern side of West Des Moines.  It heads east, between the Raccoon River to the north and the Polk–Warren county line to the south.  The first interchange, S. 35th Street, provides access to Walnut Woods State Park, which resides on the southern bank of the Raccoon River.

At the Southwest Connector, which will eventually provide a connection between I-35 and downtown Des Moines, the bypass dips to the southeast. A partial cloverleaf interchange with Iowa 28 marks the halfway point of that stretch.

Through Warren County there are three interchanges, all of which connect to major north–south streets in Des Moines.  County Road R57 (CR R57), which becomes Fleur Drive in Des Moines, intersects the bypass at a partial cloverleaf interchange.   east, CR R63, which becomes SW 9th Street, connects with a diamond interchange.  While this interchange is functionally a diamond, it is more accurately an incomplete partial cloverleaf.  Grading of the loop entrance ramps has been completed, but they have not been paved.

Just south of the Polk–Warren county line, US 65 (US 65) and US 69 intersect the bypass at a full cloverleaf interchange.  Here, US 69 is the north–south through road, while US 65 merges onto the bypass from the south and off from the north.  This last interchange in Warren County is by far the busiest of the three as over 18,000 vehicles use US 65 / US 69 daily to commute between Des Moines and Indianola.

For the next , US 65 and Iowa 5 share the bypass and straddle the county line.  Iowa 5 splits away at a trumpet interchange near Carlisle.  The bypass takes a hard turn to the north and intersects SE 64th Avenue, which becomes Army Post Road in Des Moines.

The bypass then angles to the north-northeast to cross the Des Moines River and enter the Pleasant Hill city limits.  It skirts around the eastern side of Pleasant Hill and intersects Iowa 163 at a diamond interchange.  Much like the CR R63 interchange, the Iowa 163 features a loop entrance ramp that has been graded but not paved.

North of the Iowa 163 interchange, the bypass curves to the north-northwest. It skirts the western edge of Altoona, where it intersects 8th Street SW and US 6, which runs along Hubbell Avenue, at a combined interchange.  8th Street and Hubbell Avenue are in such close proximity here that a half diamond interchange was constructed for each street and the two interchanges were connected by a short access road in each direction. It ends at a trumpet interchange with I-80.

History
The bypass was planned as two four-lane highways that would divert traffic around the south and east of Des Moines.  Iowa 500 was planned to extend from the vicinity of Avon in southern Polk County northward through Pleasant Hill and to terminate at I-80 near Altoona.  Iowa 592 was designed as a much longer highway.  It would extend from I-35 near West Des Moines to Iowa 92 south of Pleasantville.

Iowa 500
In the 1970s, the Iowa Department of Transportation (Iowa DOT) began a study on the location and environmental impact of a new highway around the east side of Des Moines.  The "500 facility" (Iowa 500), as it was referred to in the study, was loosely defined as extending from the intersection of Iowa 5 and Iowa 46 near Avon to I-80 near Altoona.  The study produced five alternatives; four potential routes and a plan that did not result in any new road construction and discussed the environmental impact of each.  The no build option was almost immediately rejected.  Since Iowa 46 passed through an industrial area on Des Moines's east side, traffic was predominantly heavy trucks.  The study projected traffic to increase to a point where Iowa 46 would be functionally obsolete.

The next option was to expand existing city streets where possible.  It would have started from the intersection of Iowa 5 and Iowa 46 near Avon and head north along Iowa 46.  At the Des Moines River, it would curve off to the northeast to the eastern side of Pleasant Hill.  It would then follow East 56th Street north Altoona, where it would curve slightly to the northwest to end at Hubbell Avenue, which carried US 65 towards Marshalltown.  This route was rejected because it quickly would have become functionally obsolete as well.  The "Inner Freeway West" route would start at Iowa 5 west of Avon.  It would head north, roughly following Four Mile Creek to University Avenue (Iowa 163).  North of University, the freeway would run to parallel East 42nd Street and end at I-80 near Berwick.  This route was rejected because it would have split eastern Des Moines into two halves and would have required many homes in the area to be demolished.  The "Outer Freeway" was the longest of the potential routes.  It would start near the Iowa 5 / Iowa 46 intersection and head to the northeast.  After crossing the Des Moines River, the freeway would curve to the east and then again to the north.  The freeway would then head due north along the east side of Altoona ending at I-80 east of the First Avenue interchange.

The most viable option was called the "Inner Freeway East".  The route would start around the Iowa 5 / Iowa 46 intersection and head northeast on a new freeway east of Iowa 46.  The freeway would travel around the east side of Pleasant Hill and east of East 56th Street.  Near Altoona, the freeway would cross over East 56th Street and head to the north-northwest.  It would end at I-80 near Altoona.  This route was selected because it was the optimal combination of length and pre-construction required.

Iowa 592
At roughly the same time that the Iowa 500 study was taking place, another study was taking place to determine the location of a bypass around the south side of Des Moines.  This highway, which was referred to as "State Arterial 592" (Iowa 592) for the study, was going to connect I-35 between West Des Moines and Cumming to Iowa 92 south of Pleasantville by way of the southern end of Iowa 500 near Avon.  This study produced five construction options, two of which had alternate routings, and a "no-build" option.

All of the construction options largely agreed that south of the intersection with Iowa 500, Iowa 592 would be an expansion of the two-lane Iowa 5 with bypasses around most of the towns along the route.

The next option was to improve Army Post Road, which carried Iowa 5 through the south side of Des Moines.  Army Post Road was an arrow-straight street from I-35 to Iowa 46, so upgrading it to four lanes would have been easy.  However, it was already a four-lane street through Des Moines, so the additional traffic that would be added by the completion of Iowa 592 would have quickly rendered the street functionally obsolete.

The final option was to not build any road.

Recognition
On September 23, 1995, the bypass was designated the Military Order of the Purple Heart Highway.  Signs were installed that year on the US 65 portion of the freeway.  Nearly ten years later, after construction had completed, signs were installed on the Iowa 5 section of the bypass.

Future
In 2012, City leaders in Des Moines and Carlisle suggested the bypass be renamed Interstate 335 in order to give the entire route a less confusing name.  The Iowa Department of Transportation said it would take over a year to determine if the design of the road would justify renaming the highway.

Exit list

References

External links

Transportation in Des Moines, Iowa
Roads in Iowa
Beltways in the United States
U.S. Route 65
Freeways in the United States
Transportation in Polk County, Iowa
Transportation in Warren County, Iowa
West Des Moines, Iowa
Bypasses in the United States